The Lambda Literary Award for Transgender Literature is an annual literary award, presented by the Lambda Literary Foundation, that awards books with transgender content. Awards are granted based on literary merit and transgender content, and therefore, the writer may be cisgender. The award can be separated into three categories: transgender fiction, transgender nonfiction, and transgender poetry, though early iterations of the award included categories for bisexual/transgender literature, transgender/genderqueer literature, and transgender literature.

Criteria

Transgender fiction 
The award for transgender fiction recognizes "[n]ovels, novellas, short story collections, and anthologies with prominent ... trans characters and/or content of strong significance to the ... trans communities." The list "[m]ay include historical novels, comics, cross-genre works of fiction, humor, and other styles of fiction."

Transgender nonfiction 
The award for transgender nonfiction recognizes "[n]onfiction works with content of strong significance to members of the ... trans communities," including "a wide range of subjects for the general or academic reader."

Transgender poetry 
The award for transgender poetry recognizes individual volumes of poems and poem collections with transgender content. Chapbooks are ineligible for the prize, as well as "[u]pdated editions of previously published works ... unless at least 50% of the poetry (not the supplemental text) is new."

History 
Though the Lambda Literary Foundation has been giving out awards since 1989, a category honoring works with transgender content was not added until 1997. In the history of the awards, the categories for transgender and bisexual literature have remained contentious. Between 1997 and 2009, nonfiction, fiction, and poetry with transgender content was combined into a single category, transgender literature, aside from 2001, in which the bisexual and transgender literature was counted as one category.

Controversy

Bailey's The Man Who Would Be Queen 
On February 2, 2004, the Lambda Literary Foundation added The Man Who Would Be Queen by J. Michael Bailey to their list of finalists or a Lambda Literary Award for Transgender Literature but removed the book on March 12, 2004 after people protested and petitioned for the removal due to transphobic content. Executive Director Jim Marks had approved the book and defended its inclusion in the awards. He resigned the following year after serving the Foundation since 1996, and the Foundation closed their website, eliminating any evidence of the controversy.

Critics noted that two major issues with the committee that led to such an issue. First, books are nominated by publishers, then made finalists by booksellers, making the award more about potential sales than literary merit. Second, the committee held no members of the transgender community, "which explains how they were unaware that the vast majority of the community found the book defamatory and irresponsible."

The Foundation launched a new website in 2006 under the guidance of Executive Director Charles Flowers, who also worked to improve the award process. While books would still be nominated by publishers and booksellers, the Foundation would have their own committee of judges, which would include at least one transgender individual.

Despite recovery efforts, many outlets have continued to use the fact that the Foundation nominated The Man Who Would Be Queen for an award as a way to validate the book's message.

Dreger's Galileo's Middle Finger 
In 2016, the Lambda Literary Foundation nominated Galileo's Middle Finger by Alice Dreger for a Lambda Literary Award for Transgender Nonfiction, even though the author "endorse[d] and actively promote[d] the theories in Bailey's book," The Man Who Would Be Queen. "[A] half-dozen national LGBT organizations" urged the Foundation to remove Galileo's Middle Finger from their list of nominees for the award, a request the Foundation later granted, stating, "“The nomination process did not include full vetting of all works to be certain that each work is consistent with the mission of affirming LGBTQ lives.”

Recipients

References 

Transgender Literature
English-language literary awards
Lists of LGBT-related award winners and nominees
Transgender literature